Lebanon Special School District (LSSD) is a K-8 school district headquartered in Lebanon, Tennessee.

It serves most of Lebanon and some unincorporated areas. Wilson County Schools operates the high schools that serve the LSSD territory.

History
Scott Benson is the director of the district. In 2019 the school board voted for a one-year renewal of Benson's contract. Benson had been promoted to Interim Assistant Director of the district in 2010.

 the district had about 2,000 students.

Schools
 Middle schools
 Walter J. Baird Middle School
 Winfree Bryant Middle School – Opened in 2010.

 Elementary schools
 Jones Brummett Elementary – Opened in August 2021
 Capacity of 800; enrollment for fall 2021 was 500–550. Becky Sevier was selected as the first principal. Named for Andy Brummett  and Steve Jones
 Castle Heights Elementary
 Byars Dowdy Elementary
 Coles Ferry Elementary
 Sam Houston Elementary

References

Further reading
  - Image gallery

External links
 Lebanon Special School District

Education in Wilson County, Tennessee
School districts in Tennessee